Jerry Lee (born April 20, 1936 in Sharon, Pennsylvania) is the President of SpotQ Services Inc and the Lee Foundation. A philanthropist of crime prevention, education and evidence-based policy-making, he was the original donor of the Stockholm Prize in Criminology, the Jerry Lee Center of Criminology at the University of Pennsylvania, the Jerry Lee Centre of Experimental Criminology at the University of Cambridge, and the Coalition for Evidence-based policy in Washington. He was the former owner of Philadelphia Radio Station, WBEB-FM, the last independent radio station in a major media market.

Appointed by President George W. Bush to serve on the United States Department of Education's Institute of Education Sciences  from 2004 to 2008, he helped to supervise over $1 billion in research funding decisions by the Institute of Education Sciences. In 2000, he was a founding Trustee of the Campbell Collaboration, a non-profit global network of program evaluators in crime, education and social services now supported by the government of Norway. In 2008 he was Knighted by His Majesty Carl XVI Gustaf, King of Sweden, and in 2010 the American Society of Criminology created an annual award named in his honour, the Jerry Lee Award for Lifetime Achievement in Experimental Criminology.

Early career 

In 1960, Jerry Lee graduated from Youngstown State University in Ohio with a bachelor's degree in Economics. His first job out of college was with a management consulting firm. A year and one half later he landed a job as the general manager of an FM station in Baltimore, even though he had never worked in radio. In 1963, he moved to Philadelphia, where he formed a partnership with the late Dave Kurtz to launch a brand new radio station, WDVR – 101 FM. One of the early stations in the US to use a “Beautiful Music” format, WDVR attracted the largest FM radio audience in the Philadelphia area within five months of its launch.

In 1980, the station changed its call letters to WEAZ, to signal the “EAZY” listening of its format. By the late 1980s, research found an audience demographic change away from beautiful music towards light rock. In 1993, the station was re-launched as WBEB-FM, with an emphasis on adult contemporary music.

Radio Station - WBEB-FM
Since 1993, Lee's station WBEB-FM (known as "B101", later "More FM", and now "B101.1") has focused on a research-based target of people listening while they worked in offices, hair salons & barbershops, retail stores and many other public places, as well as at home and in their cars. The station's audience of fans of classic modern singers. Throughout this period, many national radio groups have offered to buy the station. Kurtz and Lee always refused to sell. They soon became the last independent broadcasters in any major radio market in the US.

In 2006, Dave Kurtz died, and Jerry Lee became the sole owner of their station.

In 2018, Jerry Lee announced his plans to sell WBEB-FM to Entercom.

Service to the broadcasting industry 

Jerry Lee was first elected to the board of directors of the National Association of Broadcasters (NAB) in 1969. After repeated terms of service, he holds the record for total years on the board with 25 years of service.

In 1977, he was appointed to serve on the Advisory Committee of the House Communications Subcommittee for the rewrite of the Communications Act and co-founded the Grass Roots Government Affairs lobbying arm of the NAB. Lee then developed the concept of The Broadcast Minority Fund, responsible for $100 million in loans to provide minority ownership of broadcast properties. In 1979, he became President of the Broadcast Pioneers (predecessor organization of the Broadcast Foundation) and became a member of COLRAM (Committee on Local Radio Audience Measurement) of the NAB and is now its longest serving member.

Services to crime prevention 

In 1996, Jerry Lee and his late partner David L. Kurtz founded the Lee Foundation. According to its website, the Jerry Lee Foundation is committed to solving social problems associated with poverty, especially in American inner cities which suffer from concentrated poverty. The Foundation's special concerns are elementary education and crime. Its major strategy is to support research to find out what works, what doesn't work, and what may be promising to prevent crime and improve education. Its major projects have been established at the Universities of Maryland, Pennsylvania, and Cambridge (England).

In 1997, the University of Maryland’s Department of Criminology and Criminal Justice invited Jerry Lee to serve as Chair of the Advisory Board of its multi-million dollar “Preventing Crime” program, which extended the work of its landmark 1997 Report to the US Congress on Preventing Crime: What Works, What Doesn’t, What’s Promising.. The program made several Congressional Presentations, and in 2000 launched the annual Jerry Lee Symposium on Crime and Justice Research, originally at the US Capitol and for over 14 years held on Capitol Hill for an audience of policy-makers and practitioners.

The Jerry Lee Foundation enlisted other donors to support the Maryland Criminology Department in making term appointments of two research assistant professors (David Wilson and Spencer Lee), and of David Farrington as a Research Professor. Their work helped to lead to the founding in 2001 of the international Campbell Collaboration, of which Jerry Lee was one of three original incorporators and David Farrington was the first chair of the Coordinating Committee on Crime and Justice. The mission of the Campbell Collaboration is to provide decision makers around the world with sound evidence in implementing and evaluating policies in the areas of education, crime prevention and social services, derived from systematic reviews of research on specific policies, treatments and programs.

In 1999, the Jerry Lee Foundation, with the assistance of the Broadcast Industry Council and National Broadcast Association for Community Affairs, established an award of $2,500 to annually recognize outstanding community service programs, or programs, news series or public service campaigns promoting or examining the demonstrated effectiveness of local crime prevention programs. Also in 1999, he was elected to the Board of the Philadelphia Police Foundation and was elected chairman of the advisory board of the Fels Institute of Government at the University of Pennsylvania.

In 2000, Jerry Lee founded the Jerry Lee Center of Criminology at the University of Pennsylvania with a multimillion-dollar gift. Dean Samuel H. Preston appointed Lawrence W. Sherman, the Greenfield Professor of Human Relations, as the first director of the Lee Center, and later as the founding chair of University of Pennsylvania Department of Criminology, the first and still only department of criminology in the Ivy League. The Jerry Lee Center's goal is to foster collaboration among outstanding criminologists from around the world to further the discipline as a multi-disciplinary science in research, education and public service. The Jerry Lee Foundation supported this Center with an initial gift of $5 million, and continues to be a major donor. The Jerry Lee Foundation also endowed two Jerry Lee assistant professorships in Criminology at Penn, to which such distinguished criminologists as John MacDonald  and  Charles Loeffler were appointed. The two assistant professorships were later consolidated as the Jerry Lee Chair in Criminology. Dr. Anthony Braga,  an award-winning experimental criminologist, was appointed the first Jerry Lee Professor of Criminology at Penn.

In 2001, Jerry Lee and Lawrence Sherman in conjunction with Stockholm University Professor Jerzy Sarnecki created an annual prize in criminology that recognized the contributions the field makes to the reduction of human suffering. As president of both the American and International Societies of Criminology in 2001-2, Sherman was able to muster global civil society support for the idea. Jerzy Sarnecki organized a meeting to discuss the idea with the State Secretary for the Swedish Ministry of Justice, Dan Eliasson, and the Minister of Justice, Thomas Bodstrom. The Ministry then agreed to support the creation of an annual Criminology Symposium, organized by the Swedish National Council on Crime Prevention, if a civil society association could raise funds to provide 1,000,000 Swedish Kronor in Prize money for a ten-year period, including support from a Swedish source. The Söderberg Foundations agreed to join in the plan, as well as the Hitachi Mirai Foundation and the Japanese Correctional Association.

At the 14th World Congress of Criminology in Philadelphia in 2005, funded by the Jerry Lee Foundation, Justice Minister Bodstrom announced the creation of the Stockholm Prize in Criminology and the awarding of the first Prizes scheduled for 2006. The Prize has been awarded annually since then in the same hall as the Nobel Prize Banquet, the main room of the Stockholm City Hall. In 2010, the Söderberg Foundations offered a generous challenge grant to create a permanent endowment for the Stockholm Prize, which was matched by the Swedish Ministry of Justice under the leadership of Justice Minister Beatrice Ask. In June 2012, Queen Silvia of Sweden witnessed the signing of the documents creating the permanent Stockholm Prize Foundation by the founders and co-founders, attesting to Jerry Lee's role as the original donor to the Prize. In most years the Prize has been presented to the winners by Queen Silvia of Sweden or another member of the Swedish Royal Family. The Prize winner selection by an international, independent Jury is sponsored by the University of Stockholm.

In 2007, the Jerry Lee Foundation pledged £1,000,000 to create the Jerry Lee Centre of Experimental Criminology at the University of Cambridge. The mission of the centre, the first of its kind at any university, is to promote the use and development of experimental criminology  with  operational partners who wish to test new interventions. Experimental criminology consists principally of randomized controlled field trials to develop and test theoretically coherent ideas about reducing harm from crime. Its long-term objective is to accumulate an integrated body of evidence about both the prevention and causation of crime. The Centre has also supported Jerry Lee Scholars (all Cambridge PhD students in criminology), such as Dr. Renee Mitchell, the founding President of the American Society of Evidence-Based Policing,  and post-doctoral Jerry Lee Fellows, including Professor Barak Ariel .  The Director of Research at the Cambridge Jerry Lee Centre, Professor Lawrence W. Sherman, is known for his success in mobilizing serving police officers to design and carry out their own experiments across the UK and in other countries. The Director of the Cambridge Lee Centre, Dr. Heather Strang, is highly cited for the 12 randomized experiments in restorative justice  that she led in Australia and the UK.

Services to education 

In 1999, Lee was elected head of Drexel University’s Department of Education’s Advisory Board, in Philadelphia and was asked to join the Board of Philadelphia Reads, a literacy effort headed by the Mayor of Philadelphia. He also funded a study to determine the cost effectiveness of technology in the learning process. The grant was used to research why Union City went from one of the worst to one of the best performing school districts in New Jersey. He received the “Great Friends to Kids” (Philanthropy Award from the Please Touch Museum of Philadelphia) and was named to the National Advisory Board of the Salvation Army and in 1999 he was also elected as Chairman of the Advisory Board of the Greater Philadelphia Salvation Army.

Services to evidence-based policy 

In 2003, Lee was elected to the Board of Directors of the American Academy of Political and Social Science, the oldest social science society in the US, founded in 1889.

Awards and honors 

 2003 Honorary Fellow of the Academy of Experimental Criminology.
 2003 Recipient of the National Caring Award and inducted into the Hall of Fame for Caring Americans by the Caring Institute, Washington, DC.
 2006 Recipient of the 2006 Malcolm Beville Award for Research.
 2008 Appointed by King Carl XVI Gustaf of Sweden a Knight of the Polar Star in recognition of his role in establishing the Stockholm Prize in Criminology.

Jerry Lee has received a number of awards and recognition for his radio work:

 1987 President's Private Sector Initiative Award from President Ronald Reagan on behalf of The Broadcast Productivity Council.
 1989 President's Private Sector Initiative Award from President George H.W. Bush.
 1997 “Broadcaster of the Year” by “Radio Ink” magazine at the RAB conference in Atlanta.
 1997 Broadcast Foundation's American Broadcast Pioneer Award for a history of distinguished contribution to the industry.
 1997 “Person of the Year” by the Broadcast Pioneers of Philadelphia and inducted into the Pioneers’ “Hall of Fame.”
 1999 “Radio Broadcaster of the Year” by the Pennsylvania Association of Broadcasters.
 2001 Elected to the Hall of Fame by the PAB (Pennsylvania Association of Broadcasters).
 2004 Inducted into the “Broadcasting and Cable” Hall of Fame.
 2007 National Radio Award.
 2008 Radio Executive of the year by Radio Ink Magazine.
 2008 Named a "Giant of Broadcasting" by the Library of American Broadcasting.
 2010 Medal of Victory Award from the Wellness Community of Philadelphia for supporting their work with cancer patients.
 2011 Radio Ink's “Lifetime Leadership Award”, recognizing his lifetime of contributions to the Radio Industry.
 2017 The Pennsylvania Association of Broadcasters, Gold Medal Award.

See also 
MacDonald, John M., Robert Kaminski, and Mike Smith. 2009. The Effect of
Less-lethal Weapons on Injuries in Police Use of Force Events. American
Journal of Public Health 99: 2268-2274.

Ridgeway, Greg, and John M. MacDonald. 2009. Doubly Robust Internal Bench-
marking and False Discovery Rates for Detecting Racial Bias in Police
Stops. Journal of the American Statistical Association 104: 661-668.

MacDonald, John M., Andrew Morral, Barbara Raymond, and Christine
Eibner. 2007. The Efficacy of the Rio Hondo DUI Court: A 2-Year Field Experiment. Evaluation Review 31: 4-23.

Charles Loeffler, former Jerry Lee Assistant Professor of Criminology:

Loeffler, Charles. 2013. Does Imprisonment Alter the Life Course?  Evidence on Crime and Employment from a Natural Experiment. Criminology 51: 137-166.

Aurélie Ouss was named Jerry Lee Assistant Professor of Criminology, University of Pennsylvania, in 2018. Dr. Ouss completed a post-doctoral fellowship at the University of Chicago Crime Lab and received her PhD in economics from Harvard University in 2013. Her research, which has received support from J-PAL North America, the Robert R. McCormick Foundation, and the MacArthur Foundation, examines how good design of criminal justice institutions and policies can make law enforcement fairer and more efficient.

Phillipe, Arnaud, and Aurélie Ouss. 2018. "No Hatred or Malice, Fear or Affection": Media and Sentencing. Journal of Political Economy 126: 2134-2178.

References 

Criminology educators
People from Sharon, Pennsylvania
1936 births
American DJs
Living people